The 2009 William Jones Cup was the 31st tournament of the William Jones Cup that took place in Taipei from 12 July–26 July.

Men

Standings

Results

Women

Preliminary round

Knockout round

External links
Official website

2009
2009–10 in Taiwanese basketball
2009–10 in Asian basketball